The World Between Us is a 2021 Philippine television drama romance series broadcast by GMA Network. It aired on the network's Telebabad line up and worldwide via GMA Pinoy TV from July 5, 2021 to January 7, 2022, replacing First Yaya and was replaced by the season return of I Can See You.

Series overview

Episodes

References

Lists of Philippine drama television series episodes